Koolhaas Houselife is a documentary film directed by Ila Bêka and Louise Lemoine.

Reception
Nicolai Ouroussoff, in The New York Times, praised this film, which elevated its makers to the status of "cult figures in the European architecture world".

Published Dvd-Books
 Koolhaas Houselife, 2008, .
 Koolhaas Houselife, 2013, .

See also
Rem Koolhaas

Notes

Bibliography

 Ada Luise Huxtable, « Ingenious and Demanding », The Wall Street Journal, 2009-09-30 
 Patricia Zohn, « Culture Zohn: Life in the Koolhaas », The Huffington Post, 2010-07-30 .

External links

 Archdaily 40 Best Architecture Docs

2008 films
Italian documentary films
2008 documentary films
Documentary films about architecture
Rem Koolhaas